Wosskow is a surname. Notable people with the surname include:

Debbie Wosskow (born 1974), British entrepreneur 
Lawrence Wosskow (born 1963), British entrepreneur

See also
Waskow